Nampak (National Amalgamated Packaging) is a South African company based in Johannesburg, South Africa that specialises in the manufacturing and design of packaging.  Nampak is the largest diversified packaging company in Africa.  The company produces packaging in glass, paper, metals, and plastic.

The company's subsidiary, BevCan, is one of the largest producers of aluminium cans in Africa.  The subsidiary, DivFood, is one of the largest producers of metal cans for canning, aerosols, and metal containers in Africa. Currently, the company is focused on expanding operations into the rest of Africa.

In 2018, the company announced that it was selling its glass packaging division.

References

Companies listed on the Johannesburg Stock Exchange
Companies based in Sandton
Manufacturing companies based in Johannesburg
Packaging companies of South Africa